The 1992 London Marathon was the 12th running of the annual marathon race in London, United Kingdom, which took place on Sunday, 12 April. The elite men's race was won by Portugal's António Pinto in a time of 2:10:02 hours and the women's race was won by Germany's Katrin Dörre-Heinig in 2:29:39.

In the wheelchair races, Canada's Daniel Wesley won the men's race in a course record time (1:51:42) and Britain's Tanni Grey (2:17:23) won the women's division.

Around 83,000 people applied to enter the race, of which 34,250 had their applications accepted and around 24,500 started the race. A total of 23,833 runners finished the race.

Results

Men

Women

Wheelchair men

Wheelchair women

References

Results
Results. Association of Road Racing Statisticians. Retrieved 2020-04-19.

External links

Official website

1992
London Marathon
Marathon
London Marathon